Goodnight Moon may refer to:

 Goodnight Moon, a children's book 
 "Goodnight Moon" (song), a song by the band Shivaree
"Goodnight Moon" (Whitacre song), Eric Whitacre's 2012 arrangement of the children's book
 "Good Night, Moon", a science fiction short story
 The Goodnight Moon, an album by the band Rookie of the Year
Goodnight Moon, an ASMR YouTube creator

See also 
 Good Night (disambiguation)